James Farl Powers (July 8, 1917June 12, 1999) was an American novelist and short story writer who often drew his inspiration from developments in the Catholic Church, and was known for his studies of Catholic priests in the Midwest. Although not a priest himself, he is known for having captured a "clerical idiom" in postwar North America. His first novel, Morte d'Urban, won the 1963 National Book Award for Fiction.

Early life
Powers was born in Jacksonville, Illinois to a devout Catholic family. He graduated from Quincy College Academy, a Franciscan high school. He took English and philosophy courses at Wright Junior College and at Northwestern University in Chicago, but did not earn a degree. He had various jobs, such as insurance salesman, sales clerk, editor and bookstore clerk.

Career
Powers was a conscientious objector during World War II, and went to prison for it. Later he worked as a hospital orderly. His first writing experiment began as a spiritual exercise during a religious retreat.

His work has long been admired for its gentle satire and its astonishing ability to recreate with a few words the insular but gradually changing world of post-World War II American Catholicism. Evelyn Waugh, Flannery O'Connor, and Walker Percy praised his work, and Frank O'Connor spoke of him as "among the greatest living storytellers".

Prince of Darkness and Other Stories appeared in 1947. His story "The Valiant Woman" received the O. Henry Award in 1947. The Presence of Grace (1956) was also a collection of short stories. His first novel was Morte d'Urban (1962), which won the 1963 National Book Award for Fiction.
Look How the Fish Live appeared in 1975 and Wheat that Springeth Green in 1988.

Powers lived in Ireland for thirteen years. After moving back and forth from Ireland, he settled with his family in Collegeville, Minnesota, where he taught creative writing and English literature at Saint John's University.

Following his death in 1999, the New York Review reissued his novels and published The Stories of J. F. Powers in 2000. The Southern Illinois University Special Collections Research Center has collected the records or Manuscript Collections Created by Powers.

Family life
Powers met and married Betty Wahl after reviewing a sample of Wahl's fiction. Sister Mariella Gable, OSB, a member of the College of Saint Benedict English faculty, sent him the sample and Powers asked to meet the writer. Powers and Wahl were married in 1946 after Wahl's graduation. They had five children.

Published works
1947 — Prince of Darkness and Other Stories
1949 — Cross Country. St. Paul, Home of the Saints
1956 — The Presence of Grace
1962 — Morte d'Urban — novel 
1963 — Lions, Harts, Leaping Does, and Other Stories 
1975 — Look How the Fish Live
1988 — Wheat that Springeth Green — novel
1991 — The Old Bird, A Love Story
1999 — The Stories of J. F. Powers
2013 — Suitable Accommodations: An Autobiographical Story of Family Life: The Letters of J. F. Powers, 1942-1963 (edited by Katherine A. Powers)

References

External links

 

Minnesota Author Biographies Project: J. F. Powers 
Joseph Bottum, "The Greatest Catholic Writer of the 20th Century" (First Things)
Portland magazine: The Gospel according to J. F. Powers
 F.X. Feeney, "A Saint With a Bad Temper: J.F. Powers and Company" [L.A. Review of Books, 11 December 2013]
Novelist Jon Hassler interviews Powers about his life and early writings, Northern Lights TV series #414 (Part One) (1998):  https://reflections.mndigital.org/catalog/p16022coll38:98#/kaltura_video
Hassler interviews Powers about his literary works, Northern Lights #415 (Part Two) (1998):  https://reflections.mndigital.org/catalog/p16022coll38:99#/kaltura_video

1917 births
1999 deaths
20th-century American novelists
American Christian pacifists
American conscientious objectors
American male novelists
American Roman Catholic religious writers
National Book Award winners
Novelists from Illinois
Novelists from Minnesota
American male short story writers
20th-century American short story writers
20th-century American male writers
People from Jacksonville, Illinois
Wilbur Wright College alumni
20th-century American non-fiction writers
American male non-fiction writers
Catholics from Illinois
Members of the American Academy of Arts and Letters